Aberdeen is a neighborhood of Peachtree City, Georgia, United States.  The community is centered at Flat Creek Road and Northlake Drive.

History
A post office called Aberdeen was established in 1910, and remained in operation until 1929. The community's name is a transfer from Aberdeen, in Scotland. Aberdeen was incorporated from 1911 until 1995.

References

Populated places in Fayette County, Georgia